Pancho Gonzales defeated Eric Sturgess 6–2, 6–3, 14–12 in the final to win the men's singles tennis title at the 1948 U.S. National Championships.

Seeds
The tournament used two lists of eight players for seeding the men's singles event; one for U.S. players and one for foreign players. Pancho Gonzales is the champion; others show the round in which they were eliminated.

U.S.
  Frank Parker (quarterfinals)
  Bill Talbert (fourth round)
  Gardnar Mulloy (fourth round)
  Robert Falkenburg (quarterfinals)
  Earl Cochell (quarterfinals)
  Harry Likas (quarterfinals)
  Vic Seixas (fourth round)
  Pancho Gonzales (champion)

Foreign
  Adrian Quist (fourth round)
  Jaroslav Drobný (semifinals)
  Bill Sidwell (third round)
  Geoffrey Brown (second round)
  Eric Sturgess (finalist)
  Colin Long (second round)
  Frank Sedgman (fourth round)
  Enrique Morea (third round)

Draw

Key
 Q = Qualifier
 WC = Wild card
 LL = Lucky loser
 r = Retired

Final eight

Earlier rounds

Section 1

Section 2

Section 3

Section 4

Section 5

Section 6

Section 7

Section 8

References

External links
 1948 U.S. National Championships on ITFtennis.com, the source for this draw

Men's Singles
1948
1948 in sports in New York City